San Francisco Cathedral may refer to:

 San Francisco de Asis Cathedral Basilica (Santa Fe), New Mexico, United States
 San Francisco de Asis Cathedral (Laayoune), Western Sahara
 San Francisco Javier Cathedral (Kabankalan), Negros Occidental, Philippines

See also
 San Francisco (disambiguation)
 Church of San Francisco (disambiguation)
 Saint Francis (disambiguation)